Slowcore is a subgenre of alternative rock and indie rock. The music of slowcore artists is generally characterized by bleak lyrics, downbeat melodies, slower tempos and minimalist arrangements.  Slowcore is often used interchangeably with the term sadcore.

Characteristics 
Slowcore is a fusion genre of indie rock and sadcore, characterized by minimal musical backing, played at extremely slow speeds. Slowcore songs often feature "depressing lyrics", according to Listverse. Swedish singer Stina Nordenstam has been described as slowcore because of "her sadly beautiful little-girl whisper" style of singing.

Artists would often take influence from other genres like americana, dream pop, shoegaze and post-rock, often times straddling lines between genres.

History 
The genre began in the early 1990s as an act of rebellion against the predominant energy and aggression of grunge. The genre is linked to the band Low, who began experimenting by playing quietly and slowly to traditional rock audiences.

See also 
 Doom metal, a genre of heavy metal that also focuses on slow tempos and pessimistic lyrics
 Sadcore

References

External links
Subgenre on CDBaby
Top Ten Slowcore albums on Altmusic

 
Alternative rock genres